John Eric Thomas Eldridge (17 May 1936 – 24 December 2022) was a British sociologist known for his writings on Industrial Sociology and on Max Weber as well as for being a founder member of the media analysis research group the Glasgow Media Group. Eldridge was a professor emeritus at the University of Glasgow and a visiting professor of sociology at the University of Strathclyde He was President of the British Sociological Association from 1979 to 1981.

Eldridge was born in Southampton on 17 May 1936. He gained a BSc (Econ) from the University of London and an MA from Leicester University. Eldridge died on 24 December 2022, at the age of 86.

Positions held
Lecturer and Senior Lecturer, University of York (1964–1969), 
Professor, University of Bradford (1969–1972), 
Professor, University of Glasgow (1972–2022).

Publications
Major books include:

 Bad News (Routledge, 1976)
 C. Wright Mills (Tavistock, 1985) 
(with J.MacInnes and P. Cressey), Industrial Sociology and Economic Crisis (Harvester Wheatsheaf, 1990)
 Getting the Message: News, Truth and Power (Routledge, 1993) 
(with L Eldridge) Raymond Williams, (Routledge, 1994)
 978-0-415-12729-5 The Glasgow University Media Group Reader: News Content, Language and Visuals (ed) (Routledge, 1995)  
(with J.Kitzinger and K.Williams) The Mass Media and Power in Modern Britain (Oxford University Press,1997)

Notes

1936 births
2022 deaths
Alumni of the University of London
British sociologists
Presidents of the British Sociological Association
Alumni of the University of Leicester
Academics of the University of Glasgow
Academics of the University of Strathclyde
Academics of the University of York
Academics of the University of Bradford